The decade of the 1040s in art involved some significant events.

Events

Paintings

Xu Daoning paints Fishermen's Evening Song 1049

Births
 1045: Huang Tingjian – Chinese calligrapher, painter, and poet, one of the Four masters of the Song Dynasty (died 1105)
 1047: Cai Jing - Chinese government official and calligrapher (died 1126)
 1049: Li Gonglin – Chinese painter and civil officer in the Northern Song Dynasty (died 1106)

Deaths

References

Art
Years of the 11th century in art